Notre-Dame de Paris (meaning "Our Lady of Paris"), referred to simply as Notre-Dame, is a medieval Catholic cathedral on the Île de la Cité (an island in the Seine River), in the 4th arrondissement of Paris. The cathedral, dedicated to the Virgin Mary, is considered one of the finest examples of French Gothic architecture. Several attributes set it apart from the earlier Romanesque style, particularly its pioneering use of the rib vault and flying buttress, its enormous and colourful rose windows, and the naturalism and abundance of its sculptural decoration. Notre Dame also stands out for its three pipe organs (one historic) and its immense church bells.

Construction of the cathedral began in 1163 under Bishop Maurice de Sully and was largely completed by 1260, though it was modified in succeeding centuries. In the 1790s, during the French Revolution, Notre-Dame suffered extensive desecration; much of its religious imagery was damaged or destroyed. In the 19th century, the coronation of Napoleon I and the funerals of many of the French Republic's presidents took place at the cathedral. 

The 1831 publication of Victor Hugo's novel Notre-Dame de Paris (in English: The Hunchback of Notre-Dame) inspired interest which led to restoration between 1844 and 1864, supervised by Eugène Viollet-le-Duc. On August 26, 1944, the Liberation of Paris from German occupation was celebrated in Notre-Dame with the singing of the Magnificat. Beginning in 1963, the cathedral's façade was cleaned of centuries of soot and grime. Another cleaning and restoration project was carried out between 1991 and 2000.

The cathedral is a widely recognized symbol of the city of Paris and the French nation. In 1805, it was awarded honorary status as a minor basilica. As the cathedral of the archdiocese of Paris, Notre-Dame contains the cathedra of the archbishop of Paris (Laurent Ulrich). 

In the early 21st century, approximately 12 million people visited Notre-Dame annually, making it the most visited monument in Paris. The cathedral is renowned for its Lent sermons, a tradition founded in the 1830s by the Dominican Jean-Baptiste Henri Lacordaire. In recent years, these sermons have increasingly been given by leading public figures or government-employed academics.

Over time, the cathedral has gradually been stripped of many decorations and artworks. However, the cathedral still contains several Gothic, Baroque, and 19th-century sculptures, 17th- and early 18th-century altarpieces, and some of the most important relics in Christendom – including the Crown of Thorns, a sliver of the true cross and a nail from the true cross.

On 15 April 2019, while Notre-Dame was undergoing renovation and restoration, its roof caught fire and burned for 15 hours. The cathedral sustained serious damage. The flèche (the timber spirelet over the crossing) was destroyed, as was most of the lead-covered wooden roof above the stone vaulted ceiling. This contaminated the site and the nearby environment with lead. After the fire, restoration proposals suggested modernizing the cathedral, but the French National Assembly rejected them, enacting a law on 29 July 2019 that required the restoration preserve the cathedral's "historic, artistic and architectural interest". The task of stabilizing the building against potential  collapse was completed in November 2020, and reconstruction began in 2021. The government of France had said it hoped the reconstruction could be completed by Spring 2024, in time for the opening of the 2024 Summer Olympics in Paris. President Emmanuel Macron confirmed on 14 April 2021 that the cathedral site would be formally returned to the church on 15 April 2024, and that the first mass since the fire would be held in the cathedral nave on that day, even if the reconstruction has not been finished, but is now expected that the building will remain closed until December 2024.

Key dates
 4th century  – Cathedral of Saint Étienne, dedicated to Saint Stephen, built just west of present Cathedral.
 1163 – Bishop Maurice de Sully begins construction of new cathedral.
 1185 – Choir completed.
 c. 1200 – Construction of nave, with flying buttresses, completed; flying buttresses added to choir walls.
 c. 1210–1220 – Construction of towers begins.
 c. 1210–1220 – Two new traverses join towers with nave. West rose window complete in 1220.
 1235–1245 – Chapels constructed between buttresses of nave and choir.
 1250–1260 – North transept lengthened by Jean de Chelles to provide more light. North rose window constructed.
 1270 – South transept and rose window completed by Pierre de Montreuil.
 1699 – Beginning of major redecoration of interior in Louis XIV style by Hardouin Mansart and Robert de Cotte. 
 1725–1727 – South rose window, poorly built, is reconstructed. Later entirely rebuilt in 1854. 
 1790 – In the French Revolution the Revolutionary Paris Commune removes all bronze, lead, and precious metals from the cathedral to be melted down. 
 1793 – The cathedral is converted into a Temple of Reason and then Temple of the Supreme Being.
 1801–1802 – With the Concordat of 1801, Napoleon I restores the use of the cathedral (though not ownership) to the Catholic Church.
 1804 – On December 2, Napoleon Bonaparte crowns himself Emperor at Notre-Dame.
 1805 – The cathedral is conceded the honor of minor basilica by Pope Pius VII, making it the first minor basilica outside of Italy 
 1844–1864 – Major restoration by Jean-Baptiste Lassus and Eugène Viollet-le-Duc with additions in the spirit of the original Gothic style.
 1871 – In final days of the Paris Commune, Communards attempt unsuccessfully to burn the Cathedral.
 1944 – On August 26, General Charles de Gaulle celebrates the Liberation of Paris with a special mass at Notre-Dame.
 1949 – On April 26, the Archbishop of Paris, Emmanuel Célestin Suhard, crowns the venerated image of Our Lady of Guadalupe in the name of Pope Pius XII.
 1963 – Culture Minister André Malraux orders the cleaning of the cathedral façade of centuries of grime and soot.
 2019 – On April 15, a fire destroys a large part of the roof and the spire.
 2021 – Reconstruction begins two years after the fire that destroyed a large part of the roof and the spire.

History
It is believed that before the arrival of Christianity in France, a Gallo-Roman temple dedicated to Jupiter stood on the site of Notre-Dame. Evidence for this includes the Pillar of the Boatmen, discovered beneath the cathedral in 1710. In the 4th or 5th century, a large early Christian church, the Cathedral of Saint Étienne, was built on the site, close to the royal palace.

The last church before the cathedral of Notre-Dame was a Romanesque remodeling of Saint-Étienne that, although enlarged and remodeled, was found to be unfit for the growing population of Paris. A baptistery, the Church of Saint-John-le-Rond, built about 452, was located on the north side of the west front of Notre-Dame until the work of Jacques-Germain Soufflot in the 18th century.

In 1160, the Bishop of Paris, Maurice de Sully, decided to build a new and much larger church. He summarily demolished the earlier cathedral and chose to recycle its materials. Sully decided that the new church should be built in the Gothic style, which had been inaugurated at the royal abbey of Saint Denis in the late 1130s.

Construction
The chronicler  recorded in the Memorial Historiarum that the construction of Notre-Dame began between 24 March and 25 April 1163 with the laying of the cornerstone in the presence of King Louis VII and Pope Alexander III. Four phases of construction took place under bishops Maurice de Sully and Eudes de Sully (not related to Maurice), according to masters whose names have been lost. Analysis of vault stones that fell in the 2019 fire shows that they were quarried in Vexin, a county northwest of Paris, and presumably brought up the Seine by ferry.

The first phase began with the construction of the choir and its two ambulatories. According to Robert of Torigni, the choir was completed in 1177 and the high altar consecrated on 19 May 1182 by Cardinal Henri de Château-Marçay, the Papal legate in Paris, and Maurice de Sully. The second phase, from 1182 to 1190, concerned the construction of the four sections of the nave behind the choir and its aisles to the height of the clerestories. It began after the completion of the choir but ended before the final allotted section of the nave was finished. Beginning in 1190, the bases of the façade were put in place, and the first traverses were completed. Heraclius of Caesarea called for the Third Crusade in 1185 from the still-incomplete cathedral.

Louis IX deposited the relics of the passion of Christ, which included the Crown of thorns, a nail from the Cross and a sliver of the Cross, which he had purchased at great expense from the Latin Emperor Baldwin II, in the cathedral during the construction of the Sainte-Chapelle. An under-shirt, believed to have belonged to Louis, was added to the collection of relics at some time after his death.

The decision was made to add transepts at the choir, where the altar was located, in order to bring more light into the centre of the church. The use of simpler four-part rather than six-part rib vaults meant that the roofs were stronger and could be higher. After Bishop Maurice de Sully's death in 1196, his successor, Eudes de Sully oversaw the completion of the transepts, and continued work on the nave, which was nearing completion at the time of his own death in 1208. By this time, the western façade was already largely built, though it was not completed until around the mid-1240s. Between 1225 and 1250 the upper gallery of the nave was constructed, along with the two towers on the west façade.

Another significant change came in the mid-13th century, when the transepts were remodelled in the latest Rayonnant style; in the late 1240s Jean de Chelles added a gabled portal to the north transept topped off by a spectacular rose window. Shortly afterward (from 1258) Pierre de Montreuil executed a similar scheme on the southern transept. Both these transept portals were richly embellished with sculpture; the south portal features scenes from the lives of Saint Stephen and of various local saints, while the north portal featured the infancy of Christ and the story of Theophilus in the tympanum, with a highly influential statue of the Virgin and Child in the trumeau. Master builders Pierre de Chelles, Jean le Bouteiller, and  succeeded de Chelles and de Montreuil and then each other in the construction of the cathedral. Ravy completed de Chelles's rood screen and chevet chapels, then began the  flying buttresses of the choir. Jean le Bouteiller, Ravy's nephew, succeeded him in 1344 and was himself replaced on his death in 1363 by his deputy, Raymond du Temple.

Philip the Fair opened the first Estates General in the cathedral in 1302.

An important innovation in the 13th century was the introduction of the flying buttress. Before the buttresses, all of the weight of the roof pressed outward and down to the walls, and the abutments supporting them. With the flying buttress, the weight was carried by the ribs of the vault entirely outside the structure to a series of counter-supports, which were topped with stone pinnacles which gave them greater weight. The buttresses meant that the walls could be higher and thinner, and could have much larger windows. The date of the first buttresses is not known with any great precision beyond an installation date in the 13th century. Art historian Andrew Tallon, however, has argued based on detailed laser scans of the entire structure that the buttresses were part of the original design. According to Tallon, the scans indicate that "the upper part of the building has not moved one smidgen in 800 years," whereas if they were added later some movement from prior to their addition would be expected. Tallon thus concluded that flying buttresses were present from the outset. The first buttresses were replaced by larger and stronger ones in the 14th century; these had a reach of fifteen metres (50') between the walls and counter-supports.

John of Jandun recognized the cathedral as one of Paris's three most important buildings [prominent structures] in his 1323 Treatise on the Praises of Paris:

15th–18th century
On 16 December 1431, the boy-king Henry VI of England was crowned king of France in Notre-Dame, aged ten, the traditional coronation church of Reims Cathedral being under French control.

During the Renaissance, the Gothic style fell out of style, and the internal pillars and walls of Notre-Dame were covered with tapestries.

In 1548, rioting Huguenots damaged some of the statues of Notre-Dame, considering them idolatrous.

 in Notre-Dame's parvis was added in 1625 to provide nearby Parisians with running water.

Since 1449, the Parisian goldsmith guild had made regular donations to the cathedral chapter. In 1630, it was decided that the guild would donate a large altarpiece every year on the first of May. These works came to be known as the grands mays. The subject matter was restricted to episodes from the Acts of the Apostles. The prestigious commission was awarded to the most prominent painters and, after 1648, members of the Académie Royale.

Seventy-six paintings had been donated by 1708, when the custom was discontinued for financial reasons. Those works were confiscated in 1793 and the majority were subsequently dispersed among regional museums in France. Those that remained in the cathedral were removed or relocated within the building by the 19th-century restorers.

Thirteen of the grands mays remain in Nôtre Dame. These paintings suffered water damage during the fire of 2019 and were removed for conservation.

An altarpiece depicting the Visitation, painted by Jean Jouvenet in 1707, was also located in the cathedral.

The canon Antoine de La Porte commissioned for Louis XIV six paintings depicting the life of the Virgin Mary for the choir. At this same time, Charles de La Fosse painted his Adoration of the Magi, now in the Louvre. Louis Antoine de Noailles, archbishop of Paris, extensively modified the roof of Notre-Dame in 1726, renovating its framing and removing the gargoyles with lead gutters. Noailles also strengthened the buttresses, galleries, terraces, and vaults. In 1756, the cathedral's canons decided that its interior was too dark. The medieval stained glass windows, except the rosettes, were removed and replaced with plain, white glass panes. Lastly, Jacques-Germain Soufflot was tasked with the modification of the portals at the front of the cathedral to allow processions to enter more easily.

French Revolution and Napoleon
After the French Revolution in 1789, Notre-Dame and the rest of the church's property in France was seized and made public property. The cathedral was rededicated in 1793 to the Cult of Reason, and then to the Cult of the Supreme Being in 1794. During this time, many of the treasures of the cathedral were either destroyed or plundered. The twenty-eight statues of biblical kings located at the west façade, mistaken for statues of French kings, were beheaded. Many of the heads were found during a 1977 excavation nearby, and are on display at the Musée de Cluny. For a time the Goddess of Liberty replaced the Virgin Mary on several altars. The cathedral's great bells escaped being melted down. All of the other large statues on the façade, with the exception of the statue of the Virgin Mary on the portal of the cloister, were destroyed. The cathedral came to be used as a warehouse for the storage of food and other non-religious purposes.

With the Concordat of 1801, Napoleon Bonaparte restored Notre-Dame to the Catholic Church, though this was only finalized on 18 April 1802. Napoleon also named Paris's new bishop, Jean-Baptiste de Belloy, who restored the cathedral's interior. Charles Percier and Pierre-François-Léonard Fontaine made quasi-Gothic modifications to Notre-Dame for the coronation of Napoleon as Emperor of the French within the cathedral. The building's exterior was whitewashed and the interior decorated in Neoclassical, then in vogue.

19th-century restoration
In the decades after the Napoleonic Wars, Notre-Dame fell into such a state of disrepair that Paris officials considered its demolition. Victor Hugo, who admired the cathedral, wrote the novel Notre-Dame de Paris (published in English as The Hunchback of Notre-Dame) in 1831 to save Notre-Dame. The book was an enormous success, raising awareness of the cathedral's decaying state. The same year as Hugo's novel was published, however, anti-Legitimists plundered Notre-Dame's sacristy. In 1844 King Louis Philippe ordered that the church be restored.

The architect who had hitherto been in charge of Notre-Dame's maintenance, Étienne-Hippolyte Godde, was dismissed. In his stead, Jean-Baptiste Lassus and Eugène Viollet-le-Duc, who had distinguished themselves with the restoration of the nearby Sainte-Chapelle, were appointed in 1844. The next year, Viollet-le-Duc submitted a budget of 3,888,500 francs, which was reduced to 2,650,000 francs, for the restoration of Notre-Dame and the construction of a new sacristy building. This budget was exhausted in 1850, and work stopped as Viollet-le-Duc made proposals for more money. In totality, the restoration cost over 12 million francs.  Supervising a large team of sculptors, glass makers and other craftsmen, and working from drawings or engravings, Viollet-le-Duc remade or added decorations if he felt they were in the spirit of the original style. One of the latter items was a taller and more ornate spire, to replace the original 13th century spire, which had been removed in 1786. The decoration of the restoration included a statue of Saint Thomas that resembles Viollet-le-Duc, as well as the sculpture of mythical creatures on the Galerie des Chimères.

The construction of the sacristy was especially financially costly. To secure a firm foundation, it was necessary for Viollet-le-Duc's labourers to dig . Master glassworkers meticulously copied styles of the 13th century, as written about by art historians Antoine Lusson and Adolphe Napoléon Didron.

During the Paris Commune of March-May 1871, the Cathedral and other churches were closed down, and some two hundred priests and the Archbishop of Paris were taken as hostages.  In May, during the Semaine sanglante of "Bloody Week", as the army recaptured the city, the Communards targeted the cathedral, along with the Tuileries Palace and other landmarks, for destruction; the Communards piled the furniture together in order to burn the cathedral. The arson was halted when the Communard government realised that the fire would also destroy the neighbouring Hôtel-Dieu hospital, filled with hundreds of patients.

20th century

During the liberation of Paris in August 1944, the cathedral suffered some minor damage from stray bullets. Some of the medieval glass was damaged, and was replaced by glass with modern abstract designs. On 26 August, a special mass was held in the cathedral to celebrate the liberation of Paris from the Germans; it was attended by General Charles De Gaulle and General Philippe Leclerc.

In 1963, on the initiative of culture minister André Malraux and to mark the 800th anniversary of the cathedral, the façade was cleaned of the centuries of soot and grime, restoring it to its original off-white colour.

On 19 January 1969, vandals placed a North Vietnamese flag atop a spire of the Notre Dame, and sabotaged the stairway leading to it. The flag was cut from the spire by Paris Fire Brigade Sergeant Raymond Belle in a daring helicopter mission, the first of its kind in France.

The Requiem Mass of Charles de Gaulle was held in Notre-Dame on 12 November 1970. The next year, on 26 June 1971, Philippe Petit walked across a tight-rope strung up between Notre-Dame's two bell towers and entertained spectators.

After the Magnificat of 30 May 1980, Pope John Paul II celebrated Mass on the parvis of the cathedral.

The Requiem Mass of François Mitterrand was held at the cathedral, as with past French heads of state, on 11 January 1996.

The stone masonry of the cathedral's exterior had deteriorated in the 19th and 20th century due to increased air pollution in Paris, which accelerated erosion of decorations and discoloured the stone. By the late 1980s, several gargoyles and turrets had also fallen off or become too loose to remain in place. A decade-long renovation programme began in 1991 and replaced much of the exterior, with care given to retain the authentic architectural elements of the cathedral, including rigorous inspection of new limestone blocks. A discreet system of electrical wires, not visible from below, was also installed on the roof to deter pigeons. The cathedral's pipe organ was upgraded with a computerized system to control the mechanical connections to the pipes. The west face was cleaned and restored in time for millennium celebrations in December 1999.

21st century

The Requiem Mass of Cardinal Jean-Marie Lustiger, former archbishop of Paris and Jewish convert to Catholicism, was held in Notre-Dame on 10 August 2007.

The set of four 19th-century bells atop the northern towers at Notre-Dame were melted down and recast into new bronze bells in 2013, to celebrate the building's 850th anniversary. They were designed to recreate the sound of the cathedral's original bells from the 17th century. Despite the 1990s renovation, the cathedral had continued to show signs of deterioration that prompted the national government to propose a new renovation program in the late 2010s. The entire renovation was estimated to cost €100 million, which the archbishop of Paris planned to raise through funds from the national government and private donations. A €6 million renovation of the cathedral's spire began in late 2018 and continued into the following year, requiring the temporary removal of copper statues on the roof and other decorative elements days before the April 2019 fire.

Notre-Dame began a year-long celebration of the 850th anniversary of the laying of the first building block for the cathedral on 12 December 2012. During that anniversary year, on 21 May 2013, Dominique Venner, a historian and white nationalist, placed a letter on the church altar and shot himself, dying instantly. Around 1,500 visitors were evacuated from the cathedral.

French police arrested two people on 8 September 2016 after a car containing seven gas canisters was found near Notre-Dame.

On 10 February 2017, French police arrested four persons in Montpellier already known by authorities to have ties to radical Islamist organizations on charges of plotting to travel to Paris and attack the cathedral. Later that year, on 6 June, visitors were shut inside Notre-Dame cathedral in Paris after a man with a hammer attacked a police officer outside.

2019 fire

On 15 April 2019 the cathedral caught fire, destroying the spire and the "forest" of oak roof beams supporting the lead roof. It was speculated that the fire was linked to ongoing renovation work.

According to later studies, the fire broke out in the attic of the cathedral at 18:18. The smoke detectors immediately signaled the fire to a cathedral employee, who did not summon the fire brigade but instead sent a cathedral guard to investigate. Instead of going to the correct attic, the guard was sent to the wrong location, to the attic of the adjoining sacristy, and reported there was no fire. The guard telephoned his supervisor, who did not immediately answer. About fifteen minutes later the error was discovered, whereupon the guard's supervisor told him to go to the correct location. The fire brigade was still not notified. By the time the guard had climbed the three hundred steps to the cathedral attic the fire was well advanced. The alarm system was not designed to automatically notify the fire brigade, which was finally summoned at 18:51 after the guard had returned from the attic and reported a now-raging fire, and more than half an hour after the fire alarm had begun sounding.
Firefighters arrived in less than ten minutes.

The spire of the cathedral collapsed at 19:50, bringing down some 750 tonnes of stone and lead. The firefighters inside were ordered back down. By this time the fire had spread to the north tower, where the eight bells were located. The firefighters concentrated their efforts in the tower. They feared that, if the bells fell, they could wreck the tower, and endanger the structure of the other tower and the whole cathedral. They had to ascend a stairway threatened by fire, and to contend with low water pressure for their hoses. As other firefighters watered the stairway and the roof, a team of twenty climbed the narrow stairway of the south tower, crossed to the north tower, lowered hoses to be connected to fire engines outside the cathedral, and sprayed water on the fire beneath the bells. By 21:45, they brought the fire under control.

The main structure was intact; firefighters saved the façade, towers, walls, buttresses, and stained glass windows. The Great Organ, which has over 8,000 pipes and was built by François Thierry in the 18th century was also saved but sustained water damage. Because of the ongoing renovation, the copper statues on the spire had been removed before the fire. The stone vaulting that forms the ceiling of the cathedral had several holes but was otherwise intact.

Since 1905, France's cathedrals (including Notre-Dame) have been owned by the state, which is self-insured. Some costs might be recovered through insurance coverage if the fire is found to have been caused by contractors working on the site. The French insurer AXA provided insurance coverage for two of the contracting firms working on Notre-Dame's restoration before the blaze. AXA also provided insurance coverage for some of the relics and artworks in the cathedral.

President Emmanuel Macron said approximately 500 firefighters helped to battle the fire. One firefighter was seriously injured and two police officers were hurt during the blaze.

An ornate tapestry woven in the early 1800s is going on public display for only the third time in recent decades. The decoration was rescued from Notre-Dame de Paris cathedral after the fire.

For the first time in more than 200 years, the Christmas mass was not hosted at the cathedral on 25 December 2019, due to the ongoing restoration work after the fire.

Eight members of the cathedral choir, a number limited by COVID-19 pandemic restrictions, performed inside the building for the first time since the fire in December 2020. A video of the event aired later, just before midnight on 24 December 2020.

Stabilization of building and reconstruction
Immediately after the fire, President Macron promised that Notre-Dame would be restored, and called for the work to be completed within five years. An international architectural competition was also announced to redesign the spire and roof. The hasty spire competition announcement drew immediate criticism in the international press from heritage academics and professionals who faulted the French government for being too narrowly focused on quickly building a new spire, and neglecting to frame its response more holistically as an inclusive social process encompassing the whole building and its long-term users. A new law was immediately drafted to make Notre Dame exempt from existing heritage laws and procedures, which prompted an open letter to President Macron signed by over 1,170 heritage experts urging respect for existing regulations. The law, which passed on 11 May 2019, was hotly debated in the French National Assembly, with opponents accusing Macron's administration of using Notre-Dame self-servingly for political grandstanding, and defenders arguing the need for expediency and tax breaks to encourage philanthropic giving.

President Macron suggested he was open to a "contemporary architectural gesture". Even before the competition rules were announced, architects around the world offered suggestions: the proposals included a  spire made of carbon fibre, covered with gold leaf; a roof built of stained glass; a greenhouse; a garden with trees, open to the sky; and a column of light pointed upwards. A poll published in the French newspaper Le Figaro on 8 May 2019 showed that 55% of French respondents wanted a spire identical to the original. French culture minister Franck Riester promised that the restoration "will not be hasty." On 29 July 2019, the French National Assembly enacted a law requiring that the restoration must "preserve the historic, artistic and architectural interest of the monument".

In October 2019, the French government announced that the first stage of reconstruction, the stabilising of the structure against collapse, would take until the end of 2020. Reconstruction could not begin before early 2021. President Macron announced that he hoped the reconstructed Cathedral could be finished by Spring 2024, in time for the opening of the 2024 Summer Olympics. In December 2019, Monseigneur Patrick Chauvet, the rector of the cathedral, said there was still a 50% chance that Notre-Dame cannot be saved due to the risk of the remaining scaffolding falling onto the three damaged vaults.

The first task of the restoration was the removal of 250–300 tonnes of melted metal tubes, the remains of the scaffolding, which remained on the top after the fire and could have fallen onto the vaults and caused further structural damage. This stage began in February 2020 and continued through April 2020. Later, wooden support beams were added to stabilise the flying buttresses and other structures.

On 10 April 2020, the archbishop of Paris, Michel Aupetit, and a handful of participants, all in protective clothing to prevent exposure to lead dust, performed a Good Friday service inside the cathedral. Music was provided by the violinist Renaud Capuçon; the lectors were the actors Philippe Torreton and Judith Chemla. Chemla gave an a cappella rendition of Ave Maria.

A new phase of the restoration commenced on 8 June 2020. Two teams of workers began descending into the roof to remove the tangle of tubes of the old scaffolding melted by the fire. The workers used saws to cut up the forty thousand pieces of scaffolding, weighing altogether two hundred tons, which was carefully lifted out of the roof by an  crane. The phase was completed in November 2020.

In February 2021, the selection of oak trees to replace the spire and roof timbers destroyed by the fire began. Once cut, the trees must dry for 12 to 18 months. The trees will be replaced by new plantings.

Two years after the fire, a great deal of work had been completed but a news report stated that: "there is still a hole on top of the church. They’re also building a replica of the church’s spire". More oak trees needed to be shipped to Paris, where they would need to be dried before use; they will be essential in completing the restoration.

On September 18, 2021, the public agency overseeing the Cathedral stated that the safety work was completed, the cathedral was now fully secured, and that reconstruction would begin within a few months.

In 2022, a preventive dig carried out between February and April before the construction of a scaffold for reconstructing the cathedral's spire unearthed several statues and tombs under the cathedral. One of the discoveries included a 14th-century lead sarcophagus that was found 65 feet below where the transept crosses the church’s 12th-century nave. On April 14, 2022, France's National Archaeological Research Institute (INRAP) announced that the sarcophagus was extracted from the cathedral and that scientists have already peeked into the casket using an endoscopic camera, revealing the upper part of a skeleton. Another significant discovery was an opening below the cathedral floor, likely made around 1230 when the Gothic cathedral was first under construction; inside were fragments of a choir screen dating from the 13th century that had been destroyed in the early 18th century.

Colour and controversy
The bright colour of the restored interior will come as a shock to many visitors, accustomed to the grimy gray of the pre-fire cathedral.  "The whiteness under the dirt was quite spectacular", according to General Jean-Louis Georgelin, the French army officer heading the restoration. The stone was sprayed with a latex solution to lift the centuries of grime and soot.  However, the cleaning of the church interior with latex solutions was criticized by Michael Daley of Artwatch UK, referring to the earlier cleaning of Saint Paul's Cathedral in London. He asked, "Is there any good basis for wishing to present an artificially brightened and ahistorical white interior?"  Jean-Michel Guilemont of the French Ministry of culture responded, "The interior elevations will regain their original colour, since the chapels and side aisles were very dirty. Of course it is not a white colour. The stone has a blonde colour, and the architects are very attentive to obtaining a patina which respects the centuries".

Towers and the spire

The towers were the last major element of the cathedral to be constructed. The south tower was built first, between 1220 and 1240, and the north tower between 1235 and 1250. The newer north tower is slightly larger, as can be seen when they are viewed from directly in front of the church. The contrefort or buttress of the north tower is also larger.

The south tower was accessible to visitors by a stairway, whose entrance was on the south side of the tower. The stairway has 387 steps, and has a stop at the Gothic hall at the level of the rose window, where visitors could look over the parvis and see a collection of paintings and sculpture from earlier periods of the cathedral's history.

The fourteen bells of the cathedral are located in the north and south towers (see Bells below).

The cathedral's flèche (or spire) was located over the transept. The original spire was constructed in the 13th century, probably between 1220 and 1230. It was battered, weakened and bent by the wind over five centuries, and finally was removed in 1786. During the 19th-century restoration, Eugène Viollet-le-Duc recreated it, making a new version of oak covered with lead. The entire spire weighed 750 tonnes.

Following Viollet-le-Duc's plans, the spire was surrounded by copper statues of the twelve Apostlesa group of three at each point of the compass. In front of each group is a symbol representing one of the four evangelists: a winged ox for Saint Luke, a lion for Saint Mark, an eagle for Saint John and an angel for Saint Matthew. Just days prior to the fire, the statues were removed for restoration. While in place, they had faced outwards towards Paris, except one: the statue of Saint Thomas, the patron saint of architects, faced the spire, and had the features of Viollet-le-Duc.

The rooster weathervane atop the spire contained three relics: a tiny piece from the Crown of Thorns in the cathedral treasury, and relics of Saint Denis and Saint Genevieve, patron saints of Paris. They were placed there in 1935 by Archbishop Jean Verdier, to protect the congregation from lightning or other harm. The rooster with relics intact was recovered in the rubble shortly after the fire.

Iconography–the "poor people's book"

The Gothic cathedral was a liber pauperum, a "poor people's book", covered with sculptures vividly illustrating biblical stories, for the vast majority of parishioners who were, at the time, illiterate. To add to the effect, all of the sculpture on the façades was originally painted and gilded.

The tympanum over the central portal on the west façade, facing the square, vividly illustrates the Last Judgment, with figures of sinners being led off to hell, and good Christians taken to heaven. The sculpture of the right portal shows the coronation of the Virgin Mary, and the left portal shows the lives of saints who were important to Parisians, particularly Saint Anne, the mother of the Virgin Mary.

The exteriors of cathedrals and other Gothic churches were also decorated with sculptures of a variety of fabulous and frightening grotesques or monsters. These included the gargoyle, the chimera, a mythical hybrid creature which usually had the body of a lion and the head of a goat, and the Strix or stryge, a creature resembling an owl or bat, which was said to eat human flesh. The strix appeared in classical Roman literature; it was described by the Roman poet Ovid, who was widely read in the Middle Ages, as a large-headed bird with transfixed eyes, rapacious beak, and greyish white wings. They were part of the visual message for the illiterate worshipers, symbols of the evil and danger that threatened those who did not follow the teachings of the church.

The gargoyles, which were added in about 1240, had a more practical purpose. They were the rain spouts of the cathedral, designed to divide the torrent of water which poured from the roof after rain, and to project it outwards as far as possible from the buttresses and the walls and windows where it might erode the mortar binding the stone. To produce many thin streams rather than a torrent of water, a large number of gargoyles were used, so they were also designed to be a decorative element of the architecture. The rainwater ran from the roof into lead gutters, then down channels on the flying buttresses, then along a channel cut in the back of the gargoyle and out of the mouth away from the cathedral.

Amid all the religious figures, some of the sculptural decoration was devoted to illustrating medieval science and philosophy. The central portal of the west façade is decorated with carved figures holding circular plaques with symbols of transformation taken from alchemy. The central pillar of the central door of Notre-Dame features a statue of a woman on a throne holding a sceptre in her left hand, and in her right hand, two books, one open (symbol of public knowledge), and the other closed (esoteric knowledge), along with a ladder with seven steps, symbolizing the seven steps alchemists followed in their scientific quest of trying to transform ordinary metals into gold.

Many of the statues, particularly the grotesques, were removed from the façade in the 17th and 18th centuries, or were destroyed during the French Revolution. They were replaced with figures in the Gothic style, designed by Eugène Viollet-le-Duc, during the 19th-century restoration.

Stained glass – rose windows

The stained glass windows of Notre-Dame, particularly the three rose windows, are among the most famous features of the cathedral. The west rose window, over the portals, was the first and smallest of the roses in Notre-Dame. It is 9.6 metres (32') in diameter, and was made in about 1225, with the pieces of glass set in a thick circular stone frame. None of the original glass remains in this window; it was recreated in the 19th century.

The two transept windows are larger and contain a greater proportion of glass than the rose on the west façade, because the new system of buttresses made the nave walls thinner and stronger. The north rose was created in about 1250, and the south rose in about 1260. The south rose in the transept is particularly notable for its size and artistry. It is 12.9 metres (42') in diameter; with the claire-voie surrounding it, a total of 19 metres (62'). It was given to the cathedral by King Louis IX of France, known as Saint Louis.

The south rose has 94 medallions, arranged in four circles, depicting scenes from the life of Christ and those who witnessed his time on earth. The inner circle has twelve medallions showing the twelve apostles. (During later restorations, some of these original medallions were moved to circles farther out). The next two circles depict celebrated martyrs and virgins. The fourth circle shows twenty angels, as well as saints important to Paris, notably Saint Denis, Margaret the Virgin with a dragon, and Saint Eustace. The third and fourth circles also have some depictions of Old Testament subjects. The third circle has some medallions with scenes from the New Testament Gospel of Matthew which date from the last quarter of the 12th century. These are the oldest glass in the window.

Additional scenes in the corners around the rose window include Jesus' Descent into Hell, Adam and Eve, the Resurrection of Christ. Saint Peter and Saint Paul are at the bottom of the window, and Mary Magdalene and John the Apostle at the top.

Above the rose was a window depicting Christ triumphant seated in the sky, surrounded by his Apostles. Below are sixteen windows with painted images of Prophets. These were not part of the original window; they were painted during the restoration in the 19th century by Alfred Gérenthe, under the direction of Eugène Viollet-le-Duc, based upon a similar window at Chartres Cathedral.

The south rose had a difficult history. In 1543 it was damaged by the settling of the masonry walls, and not restored until 1725–1727. It was seriously damaged in the French Revolution of 1830. Rioters burned the residence of the archbishop, next to the cathedral, and many of the panes were destroyed. The window was entirely rebuilt by Viollet-le-Duc in 1861. He rotated the window by fifteen degrees to give it a clear vertical and horizontal axis, and replaced the destroyed pieces of glass with new glass in the same style. The window today contains both medieval and 19th century glass.

In the 1960s, after three decades of debate, it was decided to replace many of the 19th-century grisaille windows in the nave designed by Viollet-le-Duc with new windows. The new windows, made by Jacques Le Chevallier, are without human figures and use abstract grisaille designs and colour to try to recreate the luminosity of the cathedral's interior in the 13th century.

The massive fire left the three great medieval rose windows essentially intact, but with some damage. The rector of the Cathedral noted that one rose window would have to be dismantled, as it was unstable and at risk. Most of the other damaged windows were of much less historical value.

Burials and crypts

Unlike some other French cathedrals, Notre-Dame was originally constructed without a crypt. In the medieval period, burials were made directly into the floor of the church, or in above-ground sarcophagi, some with tomb effigies (French: gisant). High-ranking clergy and some royals were buried in the choir and apse, while many others, including lower-ranking clergy and lay people, were buried in the nave or chapels. There is no surviving complete record of all of the burials made at this time.

In 1699, many of the choir tombs were disturbed or covered over during a major renovation project. Remains which were exhumed were reburied in a common tomb beside the high altar. In 1711, a small crypt measuring about six meters by six meters (20' x 20') was dug out in the middle of the choir which was used as a burial vault for the archbishops, if they had not requested to be buried elsewhere. It was during this excavation that the 1st century Pillar of the Boatmen was discovered. In 1758, three more crypts were dug in the Chapel of Saint-Georges to be used for burials of canons of Notre-Dame. In 1765, a larger crypt was built under the nave to be used for burials of canons, beneficiaries, chaplains, cantors, and choirboys. Between 1771 and 1773, the cathedral floor was repaved with black and white marble tiles, which covered over most of the remaining tombs. This prevented many of these tombs from being disturbed during the Revolution.

In 1858, the choir crypt was expanded to stretch most of the length of the choir. During this project, many medieval tombs were rediscovered. Likewise the nave crypt was also rediscovered in 1863 when a larger vault was dug out to install a vault heater. Many other tombs are also located in the chapels.

Great organ

One of the earliest organs at Notre-Dame, built in 1403 by Frédéric Schambantz, was rebuilt many times over the course of 300 years, however 12 pipes and some wood survive from this ancient instrument. It was replaced between 1730 and 1738 by François Thierry, and later rebuilt by François-Henri Clicquot. During the restoration of the cathedral by Eugène Viollet-le-Duc, Aristide Cavaillé-Coll built a new organ, using pipework from the former instruments. The organ was dedicated in 1868.

In 1904, Charles Mutin modified and added several stops upon the suggestions of titular organist Louis Vierne; in 1924, an electric blower was installed, which was financed by Rolls-Royce CEO, Claude Johnson. An extensive restoration and cleaning was carried out by Joseph Beuchet in 1932 which mostly included changes to the Récit. Between 1959 and 1963, the mechanical action with Barker levers was replaced with an electric action by Jean Hermann, and a new organ console was installed.

During the following years, the stoplist was gradually modified by Robert Boisseau (who added three chamade stops: 8′, 4′, and 2′/16′) in 1968 and Jean-Loup Boisseau after 1975, all upon the orders of Pierre Cochereau. In autumn 1983, the electric combination system was disconnected due to short-circuit risk.

Between 1990 and 1992, Jean-Loup Boisseau, Bertrand Cattiaux, Philippe Émeriau, Michel Giroud, and the Société Synaptel revised and augmented the instrument throughout. A new frame for the Jean Hermann console was created. Between 2012 and 2014, Bertrand Cattiaux and Pascal Quoirin restored, cleaned, and modified the organ. The stop and key action was upgraded, a new frame for selected components of the Hermann-Boisseau-Cattiaux console was created, a new enclosed division ("Résonnance expressive", using pipework from the former "Petite Pédale" by Boisseau, which can now be used as a floating division), the organ case and the façade pipes were restored, and a general tuning was carried out. The current organ has 115 stops (156 ranks) on five manuals and pedal, and more than 8,000 pipes.

In addition to the great organ in the west end, the quire of the cathedral carries a medium-sized choir organ of 2 manuals, 30 stops and 37 ranks in a 19th-century case from the 1960s. It was heavily damaged by waterlogging, but is at least partially reusable. It also had a 5-stop single-manual continuo organ, which was completely destroyed by water from firefighters.

It was reported that the great organ itself suffered very little damage (mostly to one Principal 32' pipe and loads of dust) in the fire of April 2019, but will need cleaning.

Couplers: II/I, III/I, IV/I, V/I; III/II, IV/II, V/II; IV/III, V/III; V/IV, Octave grave général, inversion Positif/Grand-orgue, Tirasses (Grand-orgue, Positif, Récit, Solo, Grand-Chœur en 8; Grand-Orgue en 4, Positif en 4, Récit en 4, Solo en 4, Grand-Chœur en 4), Sub and Super octave couplers and Unison Off for all manuals (Octaves graves, octaves aiguës, annulation 8′). Octaves aiguës Pédalier.

Additional features: Coupure Pédalier. Coupure Chamade. Appel Résonnance. Sostenuto for all manuals and the pedal. Cancel buttons for each division. 50,000 combinations (5,000 groups each). Replay system.

Organists
The position of titular organist ("head" or "chief" organist; French: titulaires des grandes orgues) of the great organ of Notre-Dame is considered one of the most prestigious organist posts in France, along with the post of titular organist of Saint Sulpice in Paris, Cavaillé-Coll's largest instrument.

After the death of Pierre Cochereau, the cathedral authorities controversially decided to go back to the Clicquot practice of having several titulaires, and also to guarantee that no one organist would have so much influence over the organ.

  (1600–1609)
  (1609–1610)
  (1610–1616)
 Charles Racquet (1618–1643)
  (c. 1643 – 1689)
  (1689–1730)
 Guillaume-Antoine Calvière (1730–1755)
 René Drouart de Bousset (1755–1760)
  (1755–1761)
 Louis-Claude Daquin (1755–1772)
 Armand-Louis Couperin (1755–1789)
 Claude Balbastre (1760–1793)
 Pierre-Claude Foucquet (1761–1772)
 Nicolas Séjan (1772–1793)
  (1772–1783)
 Jean-Jacques Beauvarlet Charpentier (1783–1793)
  (1802–1806)
  (1806–1834)
  (1834–1840)
 Félix Danjou (1840–1847)
  (1847–1900)
 Louis Vierne (1900–1937)
 Léonce de Saint-Martin (1937–1954)
 Pierre Cochereau (1955–1984)
 Yves Devernay (1985–1990)
 Jean-Pierre Leguay (1985–2015)
 Philippe Lefebvre (since 1985)
 Olivier Latry (since 1985)
  (since 2016)

Bells

Notre-Dame currently has ten bells. The two largest bells, Emmanuel and Marie, are mounted in the south tower. The eight others; Gabriel, Anne Geneviève, Denis, Marcel, Étienne, Benoît-Joseph, Maurice, and Jean-Marie; are mounted in the north tower. In addition to accompanying regular activities at the cathedral, the bells have also rung to commemorate events of national and international significance, such as the armistice of 11 November 1918, the liberation of Paris, the fall of the Berlin Wall, and the September 11 attacks.

The bells are made with bronze for its resonance and resistance to corrosion. During the medieval period, they were often founded on the grounds of the cathedral so they would not need to be transported long distances. According to tradition, the bishop of Paris held a ceremony in which he blessed and baptized the bells, and a godparent formally bestowed a name on the bell. Most of the cathedral's early bells were named after the person who donated them, but they were also named after biblical figures, saints, bishops, and others.

After the baptism, the bells were hoisted into the towers through circular openings in the vaulted ceilings and mounted to headstocks to allow the bells to swing. Notre-Dame's bells swing on a straight swinging axis, meaning the axis of rotation is just above the crown of the bell. This style of ringing produces a clearer tone, as the clapper strikes the bell on the upswing, called a flying clapper. However, it also causes great horizontal forces, which can be up to one and a half times the weight of the bell. For this reason the bells are mounted within wooden belfries which are recessed from the towers' stone walls. These absorb the horizontal forces and prevent the bells from damaging the relatively brittle stonework. The current belfries date to the 19th century restoration.

Before the Revolution, it was common for the bells to break, and they were often removed for repairs or to be entirely recast, and sometimes renamed. The bell Guillaume, for example, was renamed three times and recast no less than five times between 1230 and 1770.

The practice of bell-ringing at Notre-Dame is recorded as early as 1198. By the end of the 14th century the bells were marking the civil hours, and in 1472 they began to call to prayer for the Angelus three times a day, both practices which continue today. During the Revolution, most of the cathedral's bells were removed and melted down. While many of them bore the names of the medieval bells, most were relatively recent recastings made from most of the same metal. During the 19th century restoration, four new bells were made for the north tower. These were replaced in 2012 with nine as part of the cathedral's 850th anniversary celebration.

In addition to the main bells, the cathedral has also had smaller secondary bells. These included a carillon in the medieval spire, three clock bells on the north transept in the 18th century, and six bells added in the 19th century – three in the reconstructed spire and three within the roof to be heard in the sanctuary. These were destroyed during the 2019 fire.

Clock

The first clocks used at Notre-Dame were clepsydras. These were used to tell the hours, which were marked by striking bells. In the 14th century Notre-Dame had two clepsydras running simultaneously, one in the cloister and one in the church itself. A lay chamberlain was responsible to keep the clocks filled with water and to notify a churchwarden when it was time to strike the bells for the hour.

In 1766, Guillot de Montjoye and Jean-Bernard de Vienne, canons and stewards of the church fabric, donated a mechanical clock to the cathedral. The movement was installed in a glass cabinet in the gallery beneath the north rose window and rang three bells placed outside above the north portal. Between 1812 and 1813, the clock and bells were moved to the north tower. A  clock face was installed inside the church below the organ platform.

During Viollet-le-Duc's restoration in the 19th century, a new clock was made. The 1867 Collin-Wagner movement, measuring two metres (6.5 feet) across, was located in the forest underneath the central spire within a glass-enclosed room. This controlled four dormer clock faces visible on the transept roofs, two on each side. This clock was destroyed by the fire. Shortly after the fire, French clockmaker Jean-Baptiste Vior discovered an almost identical 1867 Collin-Wagner movement in storage at Sainte-Trinité Church in northern Paris. Olivier Chandez, who had been responsible for the upkeep of Notre-Dame's clock, described the find as "almost a miracle." While the clock cannot simply be installed in Notre-Dame itself, it is hoped that the clock can be used to create a new clock for Notre-Dame to the same specifications as the one which was destroyed.

Ownership
Until the French Revolution, Notre-Dame was the property of the archbishop of Paris and therefore the Roman Catholic Church. It was nationalized on 2 November 1789 and since then has been the property of the French state. Under the Concordat of 1801, use of the cathedral was returned to the Church, but not ownership. Legislation from 1833 and 1838 clarified that cathedrals were maintained at the expense of the French government. This was reaffirmed in the 1905 law on the separation of Church and State, designating the Catholic Church as having the exclusive right to use it for religious purposes in perpetuity. Notre-Dame is one of seventy historic churches in France with this status. The archdiocese is responsible for paying the employees, for security, heating and cleaning, and for ensuring that the cathedral is open free to visitors. The archdiocese does not receive subsidies from the French state.

Gallery

See also

 Archbishop's Palace of Paris, destroyed 1831
 Architecture of Paris
 Gothic cathedrals and churches
 List of destroyed heritage
 List of Gothic cathedrals in Europe
 List of tallest buildings and structures in the Paris region
 Musée de Notre Dame de Paris
 Notre-Dame du Calvaire, Paris
 Roman Catholic Marian churches
 List of historic churches in Paris

Notes

Footnotes

Citations

References

English-language
 
 Davis, Michael T. "Splendor and Peril: The Cathedral of Paris, 1290–1350." The Art Bulletin (1998) 80#1 pp: 34–66.
 
 
 Jacobs, Jay, ed. The Horizon Book of Great Cathedrals. New York City: American Heritage Publishing, 1968
 Janson, H. W. History of Art. 3rd Edition. New York City: Harry N. Abrams, Inc., 1986

 Myers, Bernard S. Art and Civilization. New York City: McGraw-Hill, 1957
 
 
 
 
 Wright, Craig. Music and ceremony at Notre Dame of Paris, 500–1550 (Cambridge University Press, 2008)

French-language
 
 
 
 
 
 

 
 
 
 
 
 
 
 
 Renault, Christophe and Lazé, Christophe, Les Styles de l'architecture et du mobilier, (2006), Gisserot; 
 
 Tonazzi, Pascal. Florilège de Notre-Dame de Paris (anthologie), Editions Arléa, Paris, 2007, 
 
Trintignac, Andre and Coloni, Marie-Jeanne, Decouvrir Notre-Dame de Paris, Les Editions du Cerf, Paris, 1984

Online references

External links

 
 Official website of Notre-Dame de Paris  also 
 Official website of Friends of Notre-Dame de Paris
 Official site of Music at Notre-Dame de Paris  also 
 Notre-Dame de Paris Cathedral Fire 
 Further information on the Organ with specifications of the Grandes Orgues and the Orgue de Choeur
 Tridentine Mass celebrated in Notre-Dame in 2017

 
 Notre-Dame de Paris
Île de la Cité
12th-century Roman Catholic church buildings in France
Churches completed in 1345
14th-century Roman Catholic church buildings in France
Basilica churches in Paris
Paris, Notre-Dame de
Gothic architecture in France
Gothic architecture in Paris
Landmarks in France
Roman Catholic churches in the 4th arrondissement of Paris
Burial sites of the Pippinids
Burned buildings and structures in France
Ruins in Île-de-France
Monuments historiques of Paris
Monuments of the Centre des monuments nationaux